Qater Yuran may refer to:
 Qater Yuran-e Olya
 Qater Yuran-e Sofla